Anila Baig (born 1970) is a British Pakistani Feature Writer at The Sun.

Anila Baig, whose ancestors were from Pakistan, was born and raised in the city of Bradford. Anila Baig had her first column published in the local newspaper at the age of 16. She then went on to study English at the university and trained as a teacher. Baig began working as a journalist in 1998, when she joined the Telegraph & Argus newspaper as a trainee reporter, before moving to Yorkshire Post as a columnist. In addition to writing news reports, she also started a weekly column and won the Press Gazette Regional Columnist of the Year award 2004. She joined The Sun soon after, where she writes a weekly column and commententaries. She has also served as a TV previewer for the paper. She has also written opinion pieces for and has featured in The Mirror. She was also a finalist in the Asian Women of Achievement awards. Although not wearing a Hijab in any of her previous employments, Baig was seen on The Sun'''s Front Page donning the Muslim headscarf; however, she ditched the cloth early in 2004 leading to speculation that she and The Sun'' treated this symbol of the Islamic faith as a mere publicity gimmick. In 2006, she was signed up by Virgin Books to write her memoirs.

References

External links
Channel4:Great British Islam
BBC: "Airport did not check veiled face"
Can Anila Baig change The Sun?
Heard the one about the Mickey Mouse hijab?

English journalists
English Muslims
Living people
English people of Pakistani descent
Writers from Bradford
1970 births